— First lines from Andrew Marvell's To His Coy Mistress, first published (posthumously) this year

Nationality words link to articles with information on the nation's poetry or literature (for instance, Irish or France).

Events

Works published

Great Britain
 Richard Baxter, Poetical Fragments
 Charles Cotton, The Wonders of the Peake
 John Dryden, Absalom and Achitophel, published anonymously; a satire on Anthony Ashley Cooper, earl of Shaftesbury and James Scott, Duke of Monmouth (see also The Second Part of Absalom and Achitophel as well as other poetic responses 1682)
 Thomas D'Urfey, The Progress of Honesty; or, A View of a Court and City (see also The Malcontent 1684)
 Andrew Marvell (died 1678), Miscellaneous Poems, including "To His Coy Mistress"
 John Oldham, published anonymously
 Satyrs upon the Jesuits (the first "Satyr Upon the Jesuits" had been published in 1679 in the form of a broadside under the title Garnets Ghost)
 Some New Pieces Never Before Publisht

Other
 Thomas Hansen Kingo, Aandelige Siunge-Koor ("Spiritual Song Choir"), second part (first part 1674), Denmark

Births
Death years link to the corresponding "[year] in poetry" article:
 March 24 (March 14 O.S.) – Georg Philipp Telemann (died 1767), German composer and poet
 Johann Ernst Hanxleden (died 1732), German poet and lexicographer
 Nedîm (died 1730), Ottoman poet

Deaths
Birth years link to the corresponding "[year] in poetry" article:
 May 25 – Pedro Calderón de la Barca (born 1600), Spanish writer, poet and dramatist
 August 12 – Sir George Wharton, 1st Baronet (born 1617), English Royalist soldier, astrologer and poet
 October 7 – Nikolaes Heinsius (born 1620), Dutch poet and scholar
 December – Charles Cotin (born 1604), French abbé, philosopher and poet
 Magha 9, 1603 (Saka era) – Samarth Ramdas (born 1608), Marathi saint and religious poet

See also

 Poetry
 17th century in poetry
 17th century in literature
 Restoration literature

Notes

17th-century poetry
Poetry